Rhodobium is a genus of true bugs belonging to the family Aphididae.

The species of this genus are found in Europe, Central Asia and Northern America.

Species:
 Rhodobium porosum (Sanderson, 1900)

References

Aphididae
Hemiptera genera